Penningsveer is a town in the Dutch province of North Holland.
The town is named after the ferry (Dutch:veer) that (for a penny) used to take travellers across the Liede. Travellers over land on their way to Amsterdam would pass through Spaarnwoude before reaching Halfweg. That route became obsolete when the Haarlemmertrekvaart was dug in 1631.

References

Populated places in North Holland
Haarlemmermeer